Tibor Kreisz (born 16 April 1958) is a male former international table tennis player from Hungary.

He won a gold medal at the 1979 World Table Tennis Championships in the Swaythling Cup (men's team event) with Gábor Gergely, István Jónyer, Tibor Klampár and János Takács for Hungary.

Two years later he won a silver medal at the 1981 World Table Tennis Championships in the Swaythling Cup (men's team event) with Gergely, Jónyer, Klampár and Zsolt Kriston.

He also won a European Table Tennis Championships medal in 1978.

See also
 List of table tennis players
 List of World Table Tennis Championships medalists

References

Hungarian male table tennis players
Living people
1958 births
World Table Tennis Championships medalists